RTVideo is Microsoft's default video codec for Office Communications Server 2007 and the Microsoft Office Communicator 2007 client.
It is a Microsoft proprietary implementation of the VC-1 codec for real-time transmission purposes.
Microsoft extensions to VC-1 are based on cached frame and SP-frame.
Also it includes system-level enhancements for recovery of packet loss on IP networks - forward error correction and error concealment.

Licensing 
RTVideo is a proprietary codec. Like RTAudio this protocol can also be licensed from Microsoft.

External links

Video codecs
Microsoft proprietary codecs